Making a Good Thing Better is the ninth studio album by British-Australian singer Olivia Newton-John, released on June 1977.

The album peaked at No. 34 on the US Pop chart and No. 13 on the Country chart. It was Newton-John's first album not to reach the country top 10. The album also ended Olivia's streak of six consecutive gold albums from 1973's Let Me Be There through 1976's Don't Stop Believin'.

Background
Newton-John was in a dispute with MCA Records at the time of the recording and was in negotiations to be released from MCA, thus the label did not promote the album. At the time, Newton-John sued for her release from MCA, claiming they had not promoted her music, resulting in diminished chart placement. She attempted to promote the album and single, appearing on the cover of Us Weekly on 23 August 1977 and making a promotional clip of the song that aired on NBC's The Midnight Special.

Olivia Newton-John went on to sign on to do the movie Grease, and came to an agreement to stay with MCA Records, though her recordings from the movie were on RSO Records.

Singles
The title track was the album lead single, peaking at number 87 on the US Pop chart and No. 20 on the Adult Contemporary chart. It was Newton-John's first single not to reach the AC Top 10 since 1972's "What Is Life".

"Don't Cry for Me Argentina" was released as the album's second single in selected territories, peaking in Australia at number 32 in 1980.

Track listing

Personnel

Musicians 
 Olivia Newton-John – lead vocals, backing vocals (2, 6, 7)
 Greg Mathieson – acoustic piano (1, 2, 6, 9, 11), clavinet (3, 7), Fender Rhodes (4, 8), synthesizers (6), harpsichord (11)
 Randy Edelman – harmonium (11)
 John Farrar – electric guitar (1, 9–11), slide guitar, acoustic guitar (2, 7–9), backing vocals (9, 11)
 Jay Graydon – electric guitar (1, 4, 6, 10), acoustic guitar (2, 7–9), slide guitar (11)
 Sneaky Pete Kleinow – steel guitar (2, 8)
 El Boogre – steel guitar (9)
 Leland Sklar – bass (1–4, 6–11)
 Jeff Porcaro – drums (1–4, 6–11), percussion (1, 3, 4, 7, 11)
 Joe Porcaro – percussion (1, 7)
 Tommy Morgan – harmonica (3)
 Byron Berline – fiddle (3), mandolin (9)
 George Marge – oboe (7), ocarina (7)
 James Newton Howard – string arrangements and conductor (1, 2, 4, 10), acoustic piano (10), harpsichord (10)
 Peter Meyers – orchestra arrangements and conductor (5)
 David Campbell – string arrangements and conductor (8)
 Laura Creamer – backing vocals (1, 3)
 Myrna Matthews – backing vocals (1, 3, 6)
 Julie Rinker – backing vocals (1, 3)
 Pattie Brooks – backing vocals (6)
 Marti McCall – backing vocals (6)

Production 
 Producer – John Farrar
 Engineers – Tom Bush, Bill Schnee, Armin Steiner and Linda Tyler.
 Remixing – Bill Schnee and Elliot Scheiner
 Recorded at Sunset Sound, Sound Labs, Hollywood Sound Recorders and Western Recorders (Hollywood, CA); A & R Recording (New York, NY); Little Mountain Sound Studios (Vancouver, B.C.).
 Art direction and design – George Osaki
 Photography – Bob Stone
 Costume design/wardrobe/stylist – Fleur Thiemeyer

Charts

References

1977 albums
Olivia Newton-John albums
Albums produced by John Farrar
MCA Records albums